The Central Fire Station in Baton Rouge, Louisiana, at 427 Laurel St., was built in 1924.  It was listed on the National Register of Historic Places in 1984.  It has also been known as Bogan Fire Station and it is home to the Robert A. Bogan Firefighters Museum.

It is a two-story brick and terra cotta building with a Gothic Revival facade.

It was designed by architect William T. Nolan and was built by the City of Baton Rouge.

References

External links
Robert A. Bogan Baton Rouge Fire Museum (Facebook page)

Fire stations on the National Register of Historic Places in Louisiana
Firefighting museums in the United States
Museums in Baton Rouge, Louisiana
National Register of Historic Places in Baton Rouge, Louisiana
Gothic Revival architecture in Louisiana
Fire stations completed in 1924
1924 establishments in Louisiana